Ana Patricia Abente Brun is a Paraguayan actress and lawyer who made her film debut as Chela in Marcelo Martinessi's 2018 drama The Heiresses, which earned her a Silver Bear for Best Actress at the 68th Berlin International Film Festival.

Filmography

Awards and nominations

References

External links

 

Living people
Paraguayan film actresses
Silver Bear for Best Actress winners
Year of birth missing (living people)